William Richard Johnson (May 15, 1875 – January 2, 1938) was a U.S. Representative from Illinois.

Born in Rock Island, Illinois, Johnson moved with his parents to Freeport, Illinois, in 1879.
He attended the public schools and the College of Commerce at Freeport.
He served from 1890 to 1894 as an apprentice and from 1894 to 1899 as a locomotive blacksmith in the Illinois Central Railroad shops at Freeport.
He served as member of the United States Capitol Police 1901-1919.
He was appointed superintendent of the folding room of the House of Representatives on June 18, 1919, and served until March 3, 1925, when he resigned.

Johnson was elected as a Republican to the Sixty-ninth and to the three succeeding Congresses (March 4, 1925 – March 3, 1933).
He was an unsuccessful candidate for renomination in 1932.
He returned to Freeport, Illinois, where he died of congestive heart failure on January 2, 1938. 
He was interred in Oakland Cemetery.

References

1875 births
1938 deaths
Republican Party members of the United States House of Representatives from Illinois
People from Freeport, Illinois
People from Rock Island, Illinois
United States Capitol Police officers